Jacob Larweh (born 7 September 1996) is a Ghanaian footballer who plays as a left-back for Tema Youth SC.

Club career 
Larweh started playing for local youth side Revelation Fc, and made his debuts for the club in 2004. He left Revelations Fc in 2009 to sign for Tema Youth SC. Larweh became the captain of Tema Youth SC during the 2014/2015 season. Larweh also got a call up to the Black Stars B squad 

In January 2018, Jacob Larweh was linked to local giants Accra Hearts of Oak but a deal could not be struck so he stayed at Tema Youth

References 

1996 births
People from Tema
Living people
Ghanaian footballers
Association football defenders
Tema Youth players